Kashi Express numbered as 15017/15018 is a regular express train of Indian Railways, running between Lokmanya Tilak Terminus, Mumbai, the capital city of Maharashtra, and Gorakhpur Junction, the prominent city of Uttar Pradesh.

Coach composition
The train generally consists of a total of 22 coaches as follows:
 1 AC II tier
 3 AC III tier
 13 sleeper class
 6 unreserved
 2 unreserved cum luggage/brake van
 Loco reversal:

Locomotion
As Central Railways completed its DC–AC conversion on 12 February 2014, a Bhusawal or Itarsi-based WAP-4 hauls the train from Lokmanya Tilak Terminus to Itarsi after which an Itarsi-based WDM-3A/3D hauls the train for the remainder of its journey until Gorakhpur.

Schedule

Passenger trains originating from Gorakhpur
Transport in Mumbai
Named passenger trains of India
Rail transport in Madhya Pradesh
Rail transport in Maharashtra
Express trains in India